Christian Malford Halt served the village of Christian Malford, Wiltshire from 1926 to 1965. It was situated on the Great Western Main Line which runs from London to Bristol.

The station is located half a mile south of Christian Malford where the railway passes over Station Road. The halt consisted of two timber platforms, each with a wooden shelter. There is no trace of the halt today, although the access path on the up side is still there.

References 

Wiltshire Railway Stations, 2004, Mike Oakley,

External links
 Christian Malford Halt on navigable 1948 O. S. map
 Christian Malford Halt location on Google maps
 Christian Malford village history webpage including a photograph of the station

Disused railway stations in Wiltshire
Railway stations in Great Britain opened in 1926
Railway stations in Great Britain closed in 1965
Beeching closures in England
Former Great Western Railway stations